Corticium invisum is a species of fungus in the class Agaricomycetes. It is a corticioid fungus and a plant pathogen, the causal agent of black rot of tea (Camellia sinensis), and was originally described from Sri Lanka. Corticium invisum has never been redescribed or reviewed and is unlikely to be a species of Corticium in the modern sense. Roberts (1999) referred Petch's original specimens to Ceratobasidium cornigerum.

References

Fungal plant pathogens and diseases
Fungi described in 1925
Taxa named by Thomas Petch